This is a list of islands of Costa Rica.  There are about 79 islands in Costa Rica.

Islands 
The islands of Costa Rica include the following:

See also
 Geography of Costa Rica
 List of Caribbean islands

References

Islands
Costa Rica